Alexandre-Théodore Brongniart (15 February 1739 – 6 June 1813) was a prominent French architect.

Biography
Born in Paris, France. A prominent member of Parisian society, in 1767 he married Anne-Louise d'Egremont. The couple became friends of the royal portrait painter, Marie Louise Élisabeth Vigée-Lebrun who painted the portrait of their daughter, Alexandrine-Emilie Brongniart that now hangs in the National Gallery in London, Mademoiselle Brongniart 1788. During the Reign of Terror, Vigée-Lebrun hid in Brongniart's home before fleeing the country.

Alexandre-Théodore Brongniart was also a close friend of Jean Antoine Houdon, the pre-eminent French sculptor of the day who sculpted busts of his daughter Alexandrine-Emilie and his son Alexandre Jr. that are now in the Louvre Museum in Paris.

Alexandre-Théodore Brongniart designed hotels, including the Hôtel de Bourbon-Condé and the Hotel de Monaco, and a number of exclusive private residences. In 1781 he was received as a member of the Académie Royale d'Architecture, and in 1782 he was named architect and controller-general of the Ecole Militaire (Military School). In 1804, he was commissioned by Napoleon Bonaparte to create the layout for the famous Père Lachaise Cemetery. The Emperor was so pleased with his work that in 1807 he chose Brongniart to design the Paris Bourse (the Parisian stock exchange). Brongniart did all of the designs but it would be his last work and he would not live to see the classical Greek styled building completed in 1825. The building was named "Palais Brongniart" in his honor and remains in use to this day.

Alexandre-Théodore Brongniart died in Paris in 1813 and was interred there in the cemetery he had designed.

Family
Brongniart's son Alexandre went on to become a respected geologist and director of the famous Sèvres porcelain factory. In turn, his son Adolphe Theodore Brongniart became a famous botanist  known as the father of paleobotany and a recipient of the Wollaston Medal in science text.

References

Bibliography
 Anonymous (1996). "Brongniart, Alexandre-Théodore", vol. 4, pp. 847–848, in The Dictionary of Art, 34 volumes, edited by Jane Turner. New York: Grove. . Also at Oxford Art Online (subscription required).
 Le Bas, Philippe, editor (1840). France. Dictionnaire encyclopédique, volume 1 (A–Az). Paris: Didot Frères. See the article "Académie d'architecture", pp. 82–85 (at Google Books).

External links
 

1739 births
Architects from Paris
1813 deaths
Burials at Père Lachaise Cemetery
French neoclassical architects
18th-century French architects
19th-century French architects
Members of the Académie royale d'architecture
Lycée Condorcet alumni